Mount Coulter is a mountain in Antarctica,  northwest of Mount Gorecki in the Schmidt Hills portion of the Neptune Range of the Pensacola Mountains in Antarctica. It was mapped by the United States Geological Survey from surveys and from U.S. Navy air photos, 1956–66, and named by the Advisory Committee on Antarctic Names for LeRoy G. Coulter, cook at Ellsworth Station in the winter of 1958.

References

Mountains of Queen Elizabeth Land
Pensacola Mountains